Gabriel Taborin Technical School Foundation, Inc. is a technical school in Davao City, Philippines founded by the Congregation of Brothers of the Holy Family of Belley.

History
In the year 2000, the Brothers of the Holy Family of Belley selected Lasang, Davao as a prospective new community destination for their Philippine mission. Four brothers, Davide Del Barba, Andrés Galindo, and two Vietnamese brothers were the ones to arrive on Lasang and start their first religious community in the Philippines.

In the following year, the brothers started the “Gabriel Taborin Technical School”.

See also
Gabriel Taborin
List of colleges and universities in Davao City

References

External links
 Institute of the Brothers of the Holy Family
 Gabriel Taborin College of Davao Foundation TESDA Courses
 Gabriel Taborin College of Davao Foundation CHED Profile 

Schools in Davao City